The Rolls-Royce Boat Tail is a mid-sized luxury coach built grand tourer car made by Rolls-Royce Motor Cars. It is the world's most expensive street legal new car at US$28 million.

History
BMW, the parent company of Rolls-Royce, trademark protected the Boat Tail Concept with the European Union Intellectual Property Office on 30 May 2018, as well as with the INPI in Brazil.

Design
The car was designed by the company's specialised coachbuild division at its Goodwood plant, reinterpreting the 1910s Rolls-Royce Ltd Boat Tail car design. It draws aesthetic inspiration from yachts of the 1920s and 1930s. The car shares its chassis and engine with the Rolls-Royce Phantom; but has 1,813 bespoke parts, including five electronic control units in the rear deck. The first of three cars built features a parasol that extends from the rear deck deployed by a mechanical system in an inverted manner like a flower, rotating cocktail tables with matching stool seats, a complete set of Christofle tableware and two fridges in a colour scheme to match Armand de Brignac champagne bottles.  The deck is finished in Caleidolegno veneer and hinges towards the centre in a butterfly shape, at an angle of 67 degrees.

The first car features matching pairs of men's and women's watches manufactured by Bovet Fleurier which include a tiny sculpture of the car in the dial. The watches can be worn as a wristwatch or used as a desk clock or pocket watch, and they can also be placed in a titanium enclosure on the car's dashboard to be used as its clock. The car has a bespoke Bose Corporation sound system which uses the car's floor structure as a resonance chamber. The car includes a Montblanc pen housed in a hand-crafted case inside the glove box. The instrument panel dials feature guilloché decorative work.

References

External links

Rolls-Royce Motor Cars vehicles
Retro-style automobiles